The Church of the Holy Cross at Mwnt, Ceredigion, Wales, is a parish church and Grade I listed building dating probably from the 13th century.

History
The Church of the Holy Cross is an example of a medieval sailor's chapel of ease. The site is said to have been used since the Age of the Saints, but the present building is probably 14th century. It has an example of a 12th or 13th century font made of Preseli stone. Mwnt was a civil parish in its own right for several centuries, but before the 17th century it was a detached chapelry of the parish of Llangoedmor. Since 1934, it has been part of the parish of Y Ferwig.

The building was restored in 1853 and again after storm damage in 1917. A 1912 photograph shows the south windows in different positions.

Vandalism
In December 2021 the church was extensively vandalised; within days, an international fundraising appeal had achieved its target of £20,000. Discussions on safety and security were planned.

Structure

The interior is a single chamber with deep-set windows and an unusual roof type. The font is 13th century; the hexagonal pulpit is Victorian.

Externally, the church is whitewashed rubble stone walls under a slate roof. The small, enclosed churchyard contains a number of graves; monumental inscriptions are held by Dyfed Family History Society.

References

Mwnt